Mother Is a Whore is a 2009 South Korean drama film written and directed by South Korean indie provocateur Lee Sang-woo. It is based on a true story in Korea where a man was using his mother as a whore.

The film premiered at the 2009 Kyoto International Student Film Festival.

Synopsis
Sang-woo (Lee Sang-woo), who is HIV-positive, lives with his 60-year-old mother (Lee Yong-nyeo) in a small hut. Abandoned by his father Jung-il (Kwan Bum-tack) who left his mother for a younger woman, Sang-woo has no choice but to work as a pimp to his beloved mother to make a living.

Cast
 Lee Sang-woo as Sang-woo
 Lee Yong-nyeo as Sang-woo's mother
 Kwan Bum-tack as Jung-il, Sang-soo's father
 Yoo Ae-kyung as Jo Hee-soo
 Jeong Tae-won as Jo Hee-cheol

Reception
Hangul Celluloid's Paul Quinn: "With its intelligently written and deftly executed narrative, Mother Is a Whore serves not only as a searing, bleak and unsettling tale but also as an in-depth critique of the concept of family."

References

External links
 
 
 

2009 films
South Korean drama films
2000s Korean-language films
Films directed by Lee Sang-woo
2000s South Korean films